Jean Y. Jew, M.D. (born October 7: 1948 Greenwood, Mississippi) was a tenured professor at the University of Iowa College of Medicine. She retired in 2010.

Early life
Jew received am undergraduate biology degrees from Newcomb College, Tulane University and Tulane University School of Medicine.

Career

Research
At the University of Iowa, Jew’s research centered on the autonomic nervous system and the brain.

Harassment case
Jew sued the University of Iowa and the Board of Regents in federal court on the basis of sex discrimination under Title VII of the Civil Rights Act of 1964. 

Jew contended there were false rumors of her having a sexual relationship with her department head and that resulted in a hostile work environment. She also contends it was the reason why she wasn’t made a full professor.

She won her case, which took ten yers. Her experiences inspired her to be one of the founding members of the Iowa Women’s Foundation.

Yale Law School has a case study of the case they use for their students. 
 
The University established the Jean Jew Women’s Rights Award in 1992 to honor those “who demonstrate outstanding effort or achievement in improving the status of women on campus.”

Awards and honors
Jew is a 2018 inductee of the Iowa Women's Hall of Fame.

References

1948 births
American women physicians
Iowa Women's Hall of Fame Inductees
Living people
 People from Greenwood, Mississippi
Roy J. and Lucille A. Carver College of Medicine faculty
Tulane University School of Medicine alumni
 Women medical researchers